The U.S. state of Connecticut first required its residents to register their motor vehicles in 1903. Registrants provided their own license plates for display until 1905, when the state began to issue plates. Since then, Connecticut has used a variety of license plate designs, and has issued different designs for passenger, non-passenger, and, more recently, optional plate types that often require an additional fee. , plates are issued by the Connecticut Department of Motor Vehicles.

For most classes of vehicles, plates are issued in pairs, for the front and rear of the vehicle respectively, though single rear plates were issued between 1980 and 1987. Plates were validated with metal date tabs from 1937 through 1963, then with plate stickers until 2006, and finally with windshield stickers until 2010. Plate stickers continue to be used on plates for vehicles that do not have a windshield, or are part of fleets that frequently rotate plates among vehicles. All issues (including re-issues) since 2000 are currently valid.

Until 2013 Connecticut, as a rule, skipped the number 0 as the leading digit in its plates, with the exception of dealer plates. Between July 2013 and August 2015, temporary 1ABCD2 and 1AB-CD2 serial formats were used, both of which allowed 0 to be used as the leading digit. In August 2015, a permanent AB-12345 serial format was introduced, and the number 0 could be used as the first of the five digits in the serial.

Passenger baseplates

1905 to 1936

1937 to 1956

1957 to present
The 1956 (dated 1957) issue was the first Connecticut license plate that complied with these standards.

Plates continued to be validated with tabs each year through 1960. Monthly staggered registration commenced in 1961; tabs were used for expirations from May 1962 through February 1963, and stickers thereafter.

The "Constitution State" slogan was first used on the 1974 blue-on-white base. This base did not hold up well and was discontinued in 1976; remaining plates were recalled in 1990 and replaced with white-on-blue plates bearing the same serials.

From 1980 through 1987, only rear plates were issued as a cost-saving measure. When front plates became mandatory again in 1987, the design of the 1976 white-on-blue base was changed in order to distinguish between plates issued in pairs and rear-only plates, with a state shape added in the top left corner and the "Constitution State" slogan moved from the top to the bottom.

The current sky blue base was introduced in January 2000. Between September 2000 and August 2002, all remaining 1957–74 and 1976–99 plates were replaced with plates on this base bearing the same serials. Hence, serials issued in 1957 can be seen on the current base.

Plate stickers continued to be issued through August 2006 (the last being used for August 2008 expirations). From September 2006 through July 2010, windshield stickers were used instead (the last being used for July 2012 expirations); these were discontinued after the Connecticut Department of Motor Vehicles began allowing police agencies to use license plate scanners to verify registrations.

Notes   
1 Plus remakes of serials issued on previous bases: 123–456 and AB-1234 formats
1 Plus remakes of serials issued on previous bases: 123–456, AB-1234, and 123-ABC formats (serials from 100-AAA to 999-NZM)
2 Plus remakes of serials issued on previous bases: 123–456, AB-1234, and 123-ABC formats (serials from 100-AAA to 999-NZM)

Current plate types

Non-passenger types
A number of non-passenger types now use the AB·12345 serial format introduced on passenger plates in 2015.

Optional issues

Annual types

Political types
On both flat blue on white and Preserve the Sound bases:
Assistant Majority Leader
Assistant Minority Leader
Deputy Majority Leader
Deputy Minority Leader

Municipality codes

State agency plates

Most state agencies in Connecticut register their vehicles with state plates. The plate starts with a number to represent the agency that owns the vehicle. Some agencies, such as the Connecticut State Police, register some vehicles using regular passenger or combination plates.

References

External links
Connecticut license plates, 1969–present

Connecticut
Transportation in Connecticut
Connecticut transportation-related lists